Genkai may refer to:

 Genkai, Saga, a town in Saga Prefecture, Japan
 Genkai Sea or Genkainada, a sea in Japan
 Genkai (YuYu Hakusho), a fictional character in the anime and manga series YuYu Hakusho
 Genkai, a Japanese dictionary written by Otsuki Fumihiko
 Genkai shūraku, a term for Japanese villages that are in trouble of disappearing